Jonathon Webb (born 10 December 1983) is an Australian former professional racing driver and team owner of Team Sydney, who once co-drove alongside Fabian Coulthard in the No. 19 Holden ZB Commodore for the Pirtek Enduro Cup.

In 2016, Webb and Will Davison won Australia's most prestigious motor race, the Bathurst 1000.

Racing history

Early career
Webb, a former BMX bicycle racing champion, first came to national attention racing Porsches out of the family-run Tekno Autosports team which had previously operated racing cars for his father Steve. Webb spent several years racing in the Australian Carrera Cup Championship finishing eighth in the inaugural 2003 series. Webb's best run with Carrera Cup was third place in the 2005 series. The following year Webb made his debut in V8 Supercar as a co-driver in the endurance races for Marcus Marshall in a Paul Cruickshank Racing-prepared Ford BF Falcon.

In 2007, Webb focused full-time on V8 Supercar racing, taking the family Tekno Autosports team into the second-tier Fujitsu V8 Supercar Series, in a Stone Brothers Racing-prepared Ford Falcon. Webb finished fourth in his first season, improving to third in 2008. In 2009 Webb moved to the MW Motorsport team, a professional Fujitsu Series team for an assault on the championship. In the second half of the series Webb won six out of the last seven races in the season in an irresistible charge to the championship crown. Webb began his association with Dick Johnson Racing in 2009, taking part in his fourth season as an endurance race co-driver in the V8 Supercar Championship Series.

Supercars Championship
Webb continued this involvement into 2010, having secured a former Britek Motorsport Racing Entitlement Contract for the Tekno Autosport team. Tekno formed a technical alliance with Dick Johnson Racing, with Webb's car to effectively become the team's third car, with ownership of the franchise remaining with the Webb family. Tekno secured race number 19 from the Sieders Racing Team to use for 2010, to match DJR's existing cars, 17 (Steven Johnson) and 18 (James Courtney). Mother energy drink became the major sponsor of the #19 Ford from the 2010 Sucrogen Townsville 400. Webb won his first V8 Supercar race on the Saturday at the 2010 Sydney Telstra 500 in wet conditions.

For the 2011 season, Tekno Autosports was re-established as an independent racing team and sourced a Holden VE Commodore from Triple Eight Race Engineering. The team gradually moved forward, expanding to a second car in 2012 and matching the results Webb achieved in 2010 in the DJR fold. Despite not winning a race, Webb was the event winner of the Skycity Triple Crown in 2013. Following the 2013 season, the team downgraded to a single car for Shane van Gisbergen, leaving Webb without a full-time drive. He continued to drive for the team for the three endurance races, Sandown, Bathurst and Surfers Paradise, which collectively became known as the Enduro Cup in 2013. Alongside van Gisbergen, Webb won a race at the Gold Coast 600 in both 2014 and 2015.

In 2016, with van Gisbergen having departed the team, Webb paired with Will Davison for the Enduro Cup. Having finished third at the Sandown 500, the pairing capitalised on late drama, including a late-race penalty for Jamie Whincup, to win the Bathurst 1000.

GT
Jonathon Webb won the Dubai 24 Hour in 2008, alongside Craig Baird, Klark Quinn and Tony Quinn in a Porsche 997 GT3-RSR. In 2016 he won the Bathurst 12 Hour in a McLaren 650S entered by Tekno Autosports, alongside Van Gisbergen and Álvaro Parente.

Career results

Supercars Championship results
(key) (Races in bold indicate pole position) (Races in italics indicate fastest lap)

Complete Intercontinental GT Challenge Series results
(key) (Races in bold indicate pole position) (Races in italics indicate fastest lap)

Complete Bathurst 1000 results

Complete Bathurst 12 Hour results

References

External links 
 V8 Supercars Official Profile
 Driver Database stats
 Profile on Racing Reference

1983 births
Living people
Racing drivers from Sydney
Sportsmen from New South Wales
Supercars Championship drivers
V8SuperTourer drivers
Bathurst 1000 winners
Stone Brothers Racing drivers
Dick Johnson Racing drivers
Nürburgring 24 Hours drivers
McLaren Racing drivers
24H Series drivers